Tung Chan Wai, also transliterated as Tung Chun Wai, is a village in the San Tin area of Yuen Long District, Hong Kong.

Administration
Tung Chun Wai is a recognized village under the New Territories Small House Policy.

History
Tung Chan Wai is a Man clan village.

References

External links
 Delineation of area of existing village Tung Chan Wai (San Tin) for election of resident representative (2019 to 2022)
 Antiquities and Monuments Office. Hong Kong Traditional Chinese Architectural Information System. Tung Chan Wai

Villages in Yuen Long District, Hong Kong
San Tin